Blood of Christ, also known as the Most Precious Blood, in Christian theology refers to the physical blood actually shed by Jesus Christ primarily on the Cross, and the salvation which Christianity teaches was accomplished thereby, or the sacramental blood (wine) present in the Eucharist or Lord's Supper, which some Christian denominations believe to be the same blood of Christ shed on the Cross.

The Roman and Eastern Catholic Churches, Eastern Orthodox Church, the Oriental Orthodox churches, the Assyrian and Ancient Churches of the East, and Lutherans, together with high church Anglicans, know this as the real presence of Christ in the Eucharist. The Catholic Church uses the term transubstantiation to describe the change of the bread and wine into the body and blood of Christ. The Eastern Orthodox Churches used the same term to describe the change, as in the decrees of the 1672 Synod of Jerusalem, and the Catechism of St. Philaret (Drozdov) of Moscow.

The Lutheran churches follow the teaching of Martin Luther in defining the presence of Christ in the eucharistic elements as sacramental union (often misconstrued as consubstantiation), meaning that the fundamental "substance" of the body and blood of Christ are literally present  the substance of the bread and wine, which remain present. Lutherans too believe in and teach the Real Presence. Other Protestant churches reject the idea of the Real Presence; they observe eucharistic rites as simply memorials.

History

In the early Church, the faithful received the Eucharist in the form of consecrated bread and wine.  Saint Maximus explains that in the Old Law the flesh of the sacrificial victim was shared with the people, but the blood of the sacrifice was merely poured out on the altar. Under the New Law, however, Jesus's blood was the drink shared by all of Christ's faithful. St. Justin Martyr, an early Church Father of the 2nd century, speaks of the Eucharist as the same body and blood of Christ that was present in his Incarnation.

The tradition continued in the Church in the East to commingle the species of bread and wine, whereas in the West, the Church had the practice of communion under the species of bread and wine separately as the custom, with only a small fraction of bread placed in the chalice. In the West, the communion at the chalice was made less and less efficient, as the dangers of the spread of disease and danger of spillage (which would potentially be sacrilegious) were considered enough of a reason to remove the chalice from common communion altogether, or giving it on only special occasions. However, it was always consecrated and drunk by the priest, regardless of whether or not the laity partook. This was one of the issues debated during the Protestant Reformation. As a consequence, the Catholic Church first wanted to eliminate ambiguity, reaffirming that Christ was present both as body and as blood equally under both species of bread and wine. As time went on, the chalice was made more available to the laity. After the Second Vatican Council, the Catholic Church gave a full permission for all to receive communion from the chalice at every Mass involving a congregation, at the discretion of the priest.

Theology

Roman Catholic

The Catholic Church teaches that the bread and wine, through transubstantiation, become the body, blood, soul and divinity of Christ—in other words, the whole Christ—when consecrated.

Devotion to the Precious Blood was a special phenomenon of Flemish piety in the fifteenth and sixteenth centuries, that gave rise to the iconic image of Grace as the "Fountain of Life," filled with blood, pouring from the wounded "Lamb of God" or the Holy Wounds of Christ. The image, which was the subject of numerous Flemish paintings, was in part spurred by the renowned relic of the Precious Blood, which had been noted in Bruges at least since the twelfth century, and which gave rise, from the late thirteenth century, to the observances, particular to Bruges, of the procession of the "Saint Sang" from its chapel.

Until its removal from the General Roman Calendar in 1969, the Feast of the Most Precious Blood was assigned to July 1.

Various prayers are part of the Roman Catholic devotion to the Precious Blood. Those that mention the Blood include the Anima Christi, the Chaplet of Mercy of the Holy Wounds of Jesus, and the Chaplet of Divine Mercy.

Eastern Orthodox
The Orthodox teach that what is received in Holy Communion is the actual Resurrected Body and Blood of Jesus Christ. In the West, the Words of Institution are considered to be the moment at which the bread and wine become the Body and Blood of Christ. But for the Orthodox there is no one defined moment; rather, all that Orthodox theology states is that by the end of the Epiklesis, the change has been completed. The Orthodox also do not use the Latin theological term Transubstantiation to define the conversion from bread and wine into the Body and Blood of Christ, they use the word metousiosis without the precise theological elaboration that accompanies the term transubstantiation.

According to Saint John Damascene, the Sacred Mysteries (under the form of bread and wine) do not become incorruptible until they are actually received in faith by a believing Christian in a state of grace.

Devotion
In the Eastern Orthodox churches, and those Eastern Catholic Churches which follow the Byzantine Rite, there is no individual devotion to the Blood of Christ separate from the Body of Christ, or separated from the reception of Holy Communion.

When receiving Holy Communion, the clergy (deacons, priests and bishops) will receive the Body of Christ separately from the Blood of Christ. Then, the remaining portions of the consecrated Lamb (Host) is divided up and placed in the chalice and both the Body and Blood of Christ are communicated to the faithful using a liturgical spoon (see also Intinction).

Artistic depictions
The blood shed by Christ was a common theme in early modern Italian art. Paintings of Christ depicted on the cross and as the Man of Sorrows have consistently been some of the bloodiest images in Christian art. The blood of Christ was a compelling artistic symbol of his incarnation and sacrifice. As a theme for contemplation, it provided worshippers with a means articulate their devotion.

Relics of the Blood around the world

 Basilica of the Holy Blood, Bruges, Belgium
 Weingarten Abbey, Germany
 Abbey of the Holy Trinity, Fécamp, France
 St. James's Church, Rothenburg ob der Tauber, Germany
 Basilica di Sant'Andrea di Mantova, Mantua, Italy
 The Sudarium of Oviedo
 The Shroud of Turin
 The Relic of the Holy Blood, Westminster, England

See also
 Blood of Jesus Christ (military order)
 Body of Christ
 Missionaries of the Precious Blood
 Precious Blood Catholic Church
 Feast of the Most Precious Blood
 New Covenant
 Ichor
 Procession of the Holy Blood
 Sacramental wine
 Shroud of Turin
 Society of the Precious Blood – Anglican sisters

References

Further reading
 Faber, Frederick William. The Precious Blood: or, The Price of Our Salvation. 5th ed. 1860. London: Burns & Oates; Baltimore: John Murphy. Reprint: Rockford, Ill.: TAN Books, 1979.

External links
Precious Blood devotions
Missionaries of the Precious Blood

 

 
Biblical phrases
Sacramental theology
Christian terminology
Blood
Relics associated with Jesus